On Transparency International's 2021 Corruption Perceptions Index, Peru scored a 36 on a scale from 0 ("highly corrupt") to 100 ("highly clean"). When ranked by score, Peru ranked number 105 among the 180 countries in the Index, where the country ranked number 1 is perceived to have the most honest public sector. According to the 2021 AmericasBarometer survey of the Latin American Public Opinion Project (LAPOP), 88% of Peruvians believe that half to all politicians in the nation are corrupt, the highest percentage in Latin America according to the study.

History

Fujimori government 
Peru's most prominent political corruption scandal is probably the case of Alberto Fujimori, Peru's ex-President. Fujimori has been convicted of having ordered killings, embezzlement of public funds, abuse of power and corruption during his 10 years of presidency (1990-2000). In 2006, Fujimori fled to Japan with an alleged USD 600 million of public assets. He has been sentenced to a total of more than 30 years in prison.

During his rule, Fujimori helped to maintain the government's image of honesty by using his advisor, Vladimiro Montesinos, to carry out the administration's corrupt procedures.  Montesinos served as the head of the National Intelligence Service (SIN) where he systematically bribed politicians, judges, and the news media. An empirical analysis of Montesinos' corruption conducted by John McMillan and Pablo Zoido describes how Montesinos used over 75% of SIN's unsupervised budget to bribe over 1,600 individuals. McMillan and Zoido estimate  that at the height of the scandal more than U.S.$3.5 million was being paid monthly to various congressmen, judges and media executives. The most common bribes were paid to television-channel owners which allowed Fujimori's administration to control the media and politically influence Peruvians.

Recent history 
After further scandals and facing a second impeachment vote, Pedro Kuczynski, his successor, resigned the presidency on 21 March 2018 following the release of videos showing alleged acts of vote buying, presenting his resignation to the Council of Ministers. As a result of the Odebrecht scandal and other controversies, in 2018 all of Peru's living former president were either imprisoned or the focus of corruption investigations.

Bribery 
Irregular payments and bribes are often demanded from companies operating in Peru, and government contracts are often awarded to well-connected companies. Many companies experience the demand for facilitation payments as a result of Peru's extensive bureaucracy.

See also 
 Crime in Peru
 International Anti-Corruption Academy
 Group of States Against Corruption
 International Anti-Corruption Day
 ISO 37001 Anti-bribery management systems
 United Nations Convention against Corruption
 OECD Anti-Bribery Convention
 Transparency International

References

External links
 Peru Corruption Profile from the Business Anti-Corruption Portal

 
Peru
Politics of Peru
Crime in Peru by type
Peru